"Music Sounds Better with U" is a song by American boy band Big Time Rush from their second studio album, Elevate. The song features American rapper Mann. "Music Sounds Better With U" was leaked two weeks before its official release, which was on November 1, 2011, as the first single from Elevate.

Writing
The band co-wrote "Music Sounds Better with U" with Noel Zancanella, Eric Bellinger, and OneRepublic members Ryan Tedder & Brent Kutzle. Production of the song was also handled by Tedder. On Big Time Radio, it was announced that before the final cut, there were around "nine or ten versions of the song". The track covers the chorus from the 1998 single "Music Sounds Better with You" by Stardust.

Chart performance
"Music Sound Better with U" peaked at number 26 on the Billboard Mainstream Top 40 chart during a ten weeks chart run.

Music video
An accompanying music video premiered on Nickelodeon on November 12, 2011.

Track listing
Digital download
"Music Sounds Better with U" – 3:09

UK CD single
"Music Sounds Better with U" – 3:09
"Epic" – 3:27
"Music Sounds Better with U" (instrumental) – 3:02

UK digital download
"Music Sounds Better with U" – 3:09
"Music Sounds Better with U" (instrumental) – 3:02

Charts

Release history

References

2011 songs
2011 singles
Big Time Rush songs
Songs written by Ryan Tedder
Songs written by Brent Kutzle
Song recordings produced by Ryan Tedder
Songs written by Noel Zancanella
Columbia Records singles
Songs written by Eric Bellinger
Songs written by Thomas Bangalter
Songs written by Frank Musker
Songs about music